Hyalurga noguei is a moth of the family Erebidae. It was described by Paul Dognin in 1891. It is found in Ecuador and Peru.

References

Hyalurga
Moths described in 1891